Triptychus is a genus of sea snails, marine gastropod mollusks in the family Pyramidellidae, the pyrams and their allies.

Description
The subulate shell is  spirally paucilirate. The aperture is lirate within, subsinuated in front. The columella is triplicate.

Species
Species within the genus Triptychus include:
 Triptychus incantatus (Hertlein & A. M. Strong, 1939)
 Triptychus litosbathron Pimenta, Santos & Absalao, 2008
 Triptychus niveus (Mørch, 1875)
 Triptychus pacificus Corgan, 1973
Synonyms
 Triptychus olssoni (Bartsch, 1926): synonym of Triptychus incantatus (Hertlein & A. M. Strong, 1939)
 † Triptychus pliocena Bartsch, 1955: synonym of Peristichia pliocena (Bartsch, 1955) (original combination)

References

External links
 To ITIS
 To World Register of Marine Species
 Mörch, O. A. L. (1875). Synopsis molluscorum marinorum Indiarum occidentalium imprimis insularum danicarum. Malakozoologische Blätter. 22: 142-184

Pyramidellidae